The women's 100 metres T47 event at the 2020 Summer Paralympics in Tokyo, took place on 31 August 2021.

Records
Prior to the competition, the existing records were as follows:

Results

Heats
Heat 1 took place on 31 August 2021, at 12:09:

Heat 2 took place on 31 August 2021, at 12:15:

Final
The final took place on 31 August 2021, at 20:18:

References

Women's 100 metres T47
2021 in women's athletics